Rasbora naggsi is a minnow endemic to southern Sri Lanka. The fish was discovered from a stream running across the Sabaragamuwa Campus in Belihul-Oya, Sri Lanka.

Etymology
This species is named after the famous malacologist Fred Naggs.

See also
 Rasbora armitagei

References 

Rasboras
Freshwater fish of Sri Lanka
Taxa named by Anjana Silva
Taxa named by Kalana Maduwage
Taxa named by Rohan Pethiyagoda
Fish described in 2010